The Calumet, also commonly called the Valpo Local, was a  passenger train route operated by Amtrak between Chicago and Valparaiso, Indiana. Despite Amtrak's mandate to provide only intercity service, the Calumet was a commuter train. Transferred from Conrail in 1979, the full route was shared with Amtrak's Broadway Limited until 1990; the Calumet was discontinued the next year.

History

The service first ran August 30, 1869, by the Pennsylvania Railroad on its Pittsburgh, Fort Wayne and Chicago Railway, its main line from Pittsburgh west to Chicago. It was formally called the Chicago–Valparaiso Accommodation, but was usually colloquially referred to as the "Valpo Local" or "The Dummy". From April 1, 1871, until January 1, 1920, the Pennsylvania Company operated the line. After that it returned to direct operation by the Pennsylvania Railroad until February 1, 1968, when the PRR was merged into Penn Central Transportation. By that point, the route operated as a rush-hour commuter service, with two trains traveling from Valparaiso to Chicago at 5:55 AM and 6:35 AM and two trains returning from Chicago to Valparaiso at 5:00 PM and 5:40 PM.

With the May 1, 1971, startup of Amtrak, all Penn Central intercity trains were taken over by Amtrak, but Penn Central continued to run commuter trains in several metropolitan areas, including the Valpo Local.

The bankrupt Penn Central merged into Conrail on April 1, 1976, which continued operations until 1979, at which point Amtrak took over. The route was also served by the daily Broadway Limited to New York City, and on October 1, 1981, the daily Capitol Limited to Washington, DC, began using it. At first the Valpo Local was served by two daily trains, the Calumet and the Indiana Connection; the Indiana Connection was discontinued first.

Due to Conrail's desire to abandon part of the former PRR main line, the Broadway Limited and Capitol Limited were rerouted respectively onto the former Baltimore and Ohio Railroad and New York Central Railroad lines on November 11, 1990, leaving about half of the Calumet route with no other service. Amtrak announced that it would discontinue the Calumet on December 31. Representative Peter J. Visclosky introduced H.R. 5660 to require Amtrak to continue operations until July 1, 1991 to allow time for the State of Indiana to consider subsidizing the route. The date was changed to May 6 and the mandate was included in S. 3012 , an amendment to the Independent Safety Board Act of 1974, signed into law November 28, 1990, by U.S. President George H. W. Bush as Public Law No. 101-641. Indiana decided not to pay the required $1.5 million per year ($ in  adjusted for inflation), and the weekday-only Calumet last ran Friday, May 3, 1991.

The ChicaGo Dash express bus to Chicago, which operates during weekday rush hours, has for its Valparaiso terminal a parking lot adjacent to Franklin House and former rail station.

On August 1, 2004, the Chicago, Fort Wayne and Eastern Railroad started freight operations over the old route of the Calumet and beyond.

A study was conducted in 2017 to assess the return of service to Valparaiso, with the new service potentially running as far as Fort Wayne and northwest Ohio.

Station stops
The Calumet and Indiana Connection were assigned numbers between 321 and 324, with odd numbers running westbound and even numbers eastbound. Trains made the following station stops (some of which closed prior to Amtrak's takeover of the route):

References

External links

1990 timetable

Former Amtrak routes
Valparaiso, Indiana
Pennsylvania Railroad west of Pittsburgh
Transportation in Porter County, Indiana
Railway services introduced in 1869
Passenger trains of the Pennsylvania Railroad
Railway services discontinued in 1991